Wrecking ( or vreditel'stvo, lit. "inflicting damage", "harming") was a crime specified in the criminal code of the Soviet Union in the Stalin era. It is often translated as "sabotage"; however, "wrecking", "diversionist acts", and "counter-revolutionary sabotage" were distinct sub-articles of Article 58 (RSFSR Penal Code) (58-7, 58–9, and 58-14 respectively), and the meaning of "wrecking" is closer to "undermining".

Types of wrecking
Distinctions among the three categories in the sub-articles:
 Diversions were acts of immediate infliction of physical damage on state and cooperative property.
 Wrecking was deliberate acts aimed against normal functioning of state and cooperative organisations, such as giving deliberately wrong commands.
 Sabotage was non-execution, or careless execution, of one's duties.

As applied in practice, "wrecking" and "sabotage" referred to any action which negatively affected the economy, including failing to meet unrealistic economic targets, allegedly causing poor morale among subordinates (e.g. by complaining about conditions of work), lack of effort, or other incompetence. Thus, it referred to economic or industrial sabotage in the very broadest sense. The definition of sabotage was interpreted dialectically and indirectly, so any form of non-compliance with Party directives could have been considered a 'sabotage'.

"Wrecking" in the Soviet Census of 1937 
One of the show trials involving charges of "wrecking" was that of official coordinators of the 1937 Soviet Census. The census was organised with great expectations from the government that it would confirm the superiority of the Soviet economic and social model, with Stalin publicly declaring in 1934 that the Soviet Union was gaining at least 3 million citizens per year. The census questions and procedure were prepared for several years by a commission of professional statisticians and demographers, but then significantly changed by Stalin and other members of the Central Committee to better match their political goals – the collection phase of the census was shortened and the procedures simplified.

The results obtained from the census were at least 8 million people short of the expected outcome and immediately classified. The formal organizers were accused of "wrecking" and sent to camps, and the shortage was officially presented as caused by their negligence and acts of sabotage. The actual measurement error, as estimated by statisticians in the 1990s, did not exceed 1.5%, and the disappointing result was caused by the huge loss of life that occurred during collectivization, the Famine of 1932–1933, including in Ukraine (Holodomor), and the mortality rates in the Gulag.

Cultural depictions 
Aleksandr Solzhenitsyn, in his book of the prison camps of the Soviet Union, The Gulag Archipelago, describes Nikolai von Meck, an engineer who advised placing heavier-than-average loads on freight trains for the betterment of the economy. He was convicted of being a wrecker and shot — his supposed crime being that he had overloaded the trains for the purpose of wearing out the rails faster.

See also 
 Socialist emulation

Notes 

Political repression in the Soviet Union
Soviet phraseology
Crime in the Soviet Union
Soviet law
Incompetence